The  is a 4-laned expressway, toll road in Aichi Prefecture, Japan. It is managed by Aichi Prefectural Road Public Corporation.

Overview

Officially the road is designated as Aichi Prefectural Route 7. The road is designated  (motor vehicles must have a displacement of at least 125 cc), and the design standard of the road is similar to national expressways.

The road connects the southern portion of the Chita Peninsula with Nagoya through the Chitahantō Road. A toll plaza formerly separated these two roads since the Chitahantō Road was administered by Japan Highway Public Corporation, however since the administration of that road was transferred to Aichi Prefectural Road Public Corporation the toll plaza has been abandoned and a unified toll structure has been implemented.

Interchange list

 IC - interchange, PA - parking area

References

External links 

 Aichi Prefectural Road Public Corporation

Toll roads in Japan